Scrobipalpa strictella is a moth in the family Gelechiidae. It was described by Oleksiy V. Bidzilya and Hou-Hun Li in 2010. It is found in Hebei, China.

The forewings are covered with light-grey brown-tipped scales, mottled-ochreous scales, mainly in the subapical area and along the veins in the basal half. There is an indistinct diffused black spot surrounded by ochreous scales in the middle of the cell. The hindwings are light grey. Adults are on wing at the end of June and in early August.

Etymology
The species name refers to the narrow sacculus and vinculum processes in the male genitalia and is derived from Latin strictus (meaning narrow).

References

Scrobipalpa
Moths described in 2010